Hong San Si Temple is a Chinese temple situated in Carpenter Street of Kuching, Sarawak, Malaysia. It is part of the Kuching Heritage Trail.

History 

The temple has existed since 1848, and is dedicated to Hokkien child deity Kong Teck Choon Ong. According to its early history, the first Rajah of Sarawak, James Brooke saw a little boy playing with water next to the temple grand stage when he passed the area and began asking the temple worshippers who had just moved to the area from mainland China about the boy, only to be told that there is no children playing in the area. The temple worshippers then said the boy is a manifestation of Kong Teck Choon Ong, which is a boy deity and adding that the emperors of many Chinese dynasties in China had honoured the deity with the name.

Amused by the story, the Rajah then instructed the temple worshippers to build a water hydrant to give respect to the deity and wishing that the town of Kuching will be prospered in the future as well requesting his subjects to completing the temple building and seek his assistance if they faced any problems. During the Great Fire of Kuching in 1884, the locals saw the child deity appeared on buildings rooftops in Ewe Hai Street to give warning to nearby people and summoning rain to put out the fire. In 1993, the temple was declared as one of the historical building under the Sarawak Cultural Heritage Ordinance. The water hydrant however was torn down in the 2000s to make way for development before being replaced with a water fountain and garden by the state government in 2005. Earlier in 2004, the temple had undergoing renovation works with parts of the temple building is made from new structure.

References

External links 
 

Religious buildings and structures completed in 1848
Chinese-Malaysian culture
Taoist temples in Malaysia
Buildings and structures in Kuching
Tourist attractions in Sarawak